Berenberg is a surname. Some notable people with the surname include:

Members of the Berenberg family, a Hanseatic dynasty of merchants, bankers and senators based in Hamburg:
Cornelius Berenberg (1634–1711)
Rudolf Berenberg (1680–1746)
Paul Berenberg (1716–1768)
Johann Berenberg (1718–1772)
Elisabeth Berenberg (1749–1822)
William Berenberg (1915–2005), an American physician and Harvard professor
David P. Berenberg (1890–1974), an American socialist teacher, editor, and writer

See also
Berenberg-Gossler (surname)
Berenberg (disambiguation)